Ardonea tenebrosa is a moth of the subfamily Arctiinae. It was described by Francis Walker in 1864. It is found in Rio de Janeiro, Brazil.

References

Moths described in 1864
Lithosiini
Moths of South America